Osmanthus Alley is a 1987 Taiwanese drama film directed by Chen Kunhou. The film was selected as the Taiwanese entry for the Best Foreign Language Film at the 60th Academy Awards, but was not accepted as a nominee.

Plot
Set in early 1900s, young Ti-Hung (Lu Hsiao-Fen) and her younger brother, Ti-Jiang became orphaned when their mother died. Being the elder sibling, Ti-Hung took care of her younger brother while being under the charge of their aunt and uncle.

Years passed and Ti-Hung has grown up to be a pretty young lady with excellent embroidery skills and tiny bound feet. Her feet and embroidery works got noticed by a wealthy old matriarch, Lady Li of North Gate, who offered her only grandson, Rui Yu's (Wakin Chau), hand in marriage to Ti-Hung. A fellow villager and poor fisherman, Ah Hai (Simon Yam), who is also a friend of Ti-jiang, is fond of Ti-Hung.

It is also made known here that Ti-Hung is born with the "Cut Palm" fate through a conversation from Ti-Jiang and his fellow fishermen friends. Men born with such a fate would become an official or a great person. Whereas women born with the "cut palm" would be a jinx to the men in their life. Ti-Hung overhears the conversation and appears to be affected by it.

At that same moment, Ti-Jiang dies during a drowning accident while out fishing. All alone by herself, Ti-Hung agrees to marry Rui Yu. Being married into the wealthy Hsin family would also pave her way out of poverty.

Life was rosy for Ti-Hung after marriage and she soon gave birth to a son, Hui Chih. But happiness for her was short-lived. Rui Yu dies of pneumonia and leaves behind his 23-year-old wife with a young 5-year old child. Without the support from old Lady Li, Rui Yu's uncle volunteers to handle the family's account in the absence of his nephew. Being the only kin of Hui Chih, Ti-Hung became an over-protective and strict mother. Ti-Hung blames her bad fate for the cause of Rui Yu's early demise. However, when she found out that her late husband was meant to be short-lived through revelation from Rui Yu's uncle of a monk's predictions of Rui Yu when he was a young boy, she felt relieved.

Free from guilt, Ti-Hung starts to enjoy her new status as mistress of the family while living off her inheritance. She got addicted to opera and neglected her duties to her family until her long time personal maid, Hsin Yue, hinted to her of the family slowly falling apart. Not only was Rui Yu's uncle the main caregiver to Hui Chih, but he was also heavily addicted to opium. Going through the family's accounts, Ti-Hung realised that Rui Yu's uncle had piled on debts through his unhealthy habit. For the safety of Hui Chih, she sent him away to Japan for further studies while she stayed back to settle issues with her uncle.

Not long after, Rui Yu's uncle passed away and she attended his wake while feigning sorrow. Ironically, she picked up opium smoking while at the wake. From there, she took a liking to her uncle's personal young servant, Chun Shu (Tuo Chung-hua), and began an affair with him. Noticing that Chun Shu starts getting cocky after their one-night stand, Ti-Hung sets him up for theft and have him put away in a bid to silence him about their affair.

Shortly after, Ti-Hung realises that she is pregnant and tries to hide the pregnancy when a grown up Hui Chih comes back to visit his mother. Eventually, Ti-Hung comes clean to Hui Chih on her pregnancy. Hui Chih accepts it and plans to bring his mother to Japan for a vacation and deliver her child so as not to incite rumours and gossips in their hometown. The newborn is then given up for adoption in Japan.

Back in her hometown, Ti-Hung worries about Hsin Yue's youth and marriageability. Hsin Yue reveals that a dowry was made to her for her hand in marriage. The proposal came from Ah Chu, a family staff (and Hsin Yue's crush) that Ti-Hung fired many years ago for allegedly 'leading Hui Chih astray'. Happy for Hsin Yue, yet sad at the same time, Ti-Hung gives her blessings to the couple.

Fast forward to many decades, Ti-Hung is now in her 70s and ageing badly. At a temple one day, she found out that Ah Hai has eked out his own living from a fisherman to a wealthy businessman and is now an influential person. Hui Chih is always busy at work being a delegate to the Japanese and hardly visits or calls his mother. Scenes of Ti-Hung's youth flashes past her as she slowly passes away peacefully all alone by herself among the riches around her. As her life had destined, Ti-Hung will ultimately be alone in her end of days.

Cast
 Lu Hsiao-Fen as Ti Hung
 Lin Hsiu-ling as Hsin Yue
Wakin Chau as Rui Yu
 Tuo Chung-hua as Chun Shu
 Simon Yam as Ah Hai
 Osmany Rodríguez

See also
 List of submissions to the 60th Academy Awards for Best Foreign Language Film
 List of Taiwanese submissions for the Academy Award for Best Foreign Language Film

References

External links
 

1987 films
1987 drama films
Taiwanese drama films
Mandarin-language films
Central Motion Picture Corporation films